EGR may refer to:

Transportation
 Eagle Air (Guinea) (ICAO code), a Guinean airline
 Eagle Air (Sierra Leone) (ICAO code), a defunct Sierra Leonean airline
 East Grinstead railway station (station code), England

Other uses
 Early growth response proteins
 Earnhardt Ganassi Racing, a NASCAR team
 East Grand Rapids, Michigan
 EGaming Review, a British online gambling publishing brand
 Exhaust gas recirculation, in internal combustion engines